The Minnamurra River massacre is an attack that occurred in 1818 along the Minnamurra River on an unknown number of Wodiwodi people by nine European settlers.

On 1 October 1818, a number of indigenous Australians of the Wodiwodi people were attacked and killed along the banks of the Minnamurra River. The attack was led by local Dapto property owner, Lt. William Frederick Weston, his site overseer, Cornelius O'Brien, along with seven undisclosed convicts and labourers. The group attacked an Aboriginal campsite in the early hours of the morning, armed with muskets, swords and knives attached to long sticks. The settlers were alleged to have been attempting to recover two muskets which had been lent to the Aboriginal people of the area.

Location 

Although the exact location of the massacre site has previously been disputed by historians, ongoing research at the Newcastle University, led by historian Professor Lyndall Ryan, has led to an agreement of the approximate location of the massacre site. This has stemmed from a large investigative project that has been established to map out a series of massacre sites across New South Wales, with estimates showing a network of at least 150 massacres resulting in approximately 6,000 deaths. Across Australia the research and mapping has revealed at least 311 massacres over a period of 140 years.

Aboriginal Liaison Officers of the Illawarra claim to have knowledge on the exact location however the details of which have been kept private. The Kiama Council has plans to erect a permanent memorial of recognition along the proposed Minnamurra boardwalk, commemorated by a memorial service on the 200th year anniversary of the massacre.

Controversy 
, a recent proposition from the Boral mining company to expand its operations in the Dunmore area has sparked opposition from the community, with plans to access new pits for extraction of approximately 1.35 million tonnes of sand over the course of four years.

Further development in this area is likely to impact the sensitive sites along the Minnamurra River as well as risking environmental impacts.

See also 

 List of massacres of Indigenous Australians
 Australian frontier wars

References 

History of Australia (1788–1850)
1818 in Australia
Conflicts in 1818
Massacres in 1818
19th century in New South Wales
October 1818 events
Massacres of Indigenous Australians